The Dinjapygidae family of diplurans contains one genus, with six recognized species:

 Genus Dinjapyx Silvestri, 1930
 Dinjapyx barbatus Silvestri, 1930
 Dinjapyx manni Silvestri, 1948
 Dinjapyx marcusi Silvestri, 1948
 Dinjapyx michelbacheri (Smith, 1959)
 Dinjapyx rossi (Smith, 1959)
 Dinjapyx weyrauchi González, 1964

References

Diplura
Arthropod families